James Beckford (born 9 January 1975 in Saint Mary, Jamaica) is a Jamaican track and field athlete competing in the long jump. He represented Jamaica at the Olympic level in 1996, 2000 and 2004. He was the silver medallist in the long jump at the 1996 Olympics and also has two silvers from the World Championships in Athletics (from 1995 and 2003). He was chosen as the Jamaica Sportsman of the Year for 1995, 1996 and 2003. He is the current holder of the Jamaican record for the triple jump with a mark of 17.92 m, and was also the holder of the long jump record at 8.62m until 28 September. 2019 when it was replaced with a mark of 8.69 m by Tajay Gayle at the World Championships in Athletics in Doha, Qatar.

Beckford was educated in the United States and began his athletics career there, specialising in the horizontal jumps. He took the triple jump title at Florida's Class AAAA championship, representing William R. Boone High School. He moved to Texas to study at Blinn College. While there he improved Delroy Poyser's Jamaican record with a jump of 17.29 metres (56 ft 8¾ in) – a mark which was also the world-leading outdoor jump at that point in April 1994.

Since he made that jump, 5 April 1997 in Orlando, Florida, only 6 men have jumped farther.

He was banned from competition for three months in 1997 after he failed a drug test for ephedrine, a banned stimulant.

He has competed at the World Championships on five occasions and the IAAF World Indoor Championships on six occasions. Aside from his global performances, he has won medals at the Summer Universiade, the Goodwill Games, the IAAF Grand Prix Final, as well as a silver medal from the 1998 CAC Games.

He remains active, winning the 2018 World Masters Championships.

Achievements

See also
List of sportspeople sanctioned for doping offences

References

1975 births
Living people
People from Saint Mary Parish, Jamaica
Jamaican male long jumpers
Jamaican male triple jumpers
Olympic athletes of Jamaica
Athletes (track and field) at the 1996 Summer Olympics
Athletes (track and field) at the 2000 Summer Olympics
Athletes (track and field) at the 2004 Summer Olympics
Olympic silver medalists for Jamaica
Doping cases in athletics
Blinn College alumni
Jamaican sportspeople in doping cases
World Athletics Championships medalists
Junior college men's track and field athletes in the United States
Medalists at the 1996 Summer Olympics
Olympic silver medalists in athletics (track and field)
Universiade medalists in athletics (track and field)
Goodwill Games medalists in athletics
Central American and Caribbean Games silver medalists for Jamaica
Competitors at the 1998 Central American and Caribbean Games
Universiade silver medalists for Jamaica
Central American and Caribbean Games medalists in athletics
Medalists at the 1997 Summer Universiade
Competitors at the 1998 Goodwill Games
Competitors at the 2001 Goodwill Games
Goodwill Games gold medalists in athletics